1-Phosphatidylinositol-4,5-bisphosphate phosphodiesterase epsilon-1 (PLCE1) is an enzyme that in humans is encoded by the PLCE1 gene. This gene encodes a phospholipase enzyme (PLCE1) that catalyzes the hydrolysis of phosphatidylinositol-4,5-bisphosphate to generate two second messengers: inositol 1,4,5-triphosphate (IP3) and diacylglycerol (DAG). Mutations in this gene cause early-onset nephrotic syndrome and have been associated with respiratory chain deficiency with diffuse mesangial sclerosis.

Structure 
PLCE1 is located on the q arm of chromosome 10 in position 23.33 and has 39 exons. PLCE1, the protein encoded by this gene, is located on the Golgi apparatus, the cell membrane, and in the cytosol. It contains 3 turns, 15 beta strands, and 6 alpha helixes. PLCE1 contains a 260 amino acid Ras-GEF domain at p. 531-790, a 149 amino acid PI-PLC X-box domain at p. 1392-1540, a 117 amino acid PI-PLC Y-box domain at p. 1730 – 1846, a 101 amino acid C2 domain at p. 1856 – 1956, a 103 amino acid Ras-associating 1 domain at p. 2012 – 2114, and a 104 amino acid Ras-associating 2 domain at p. 2135 – 2238. There is a region of 79 amino acids from p. 1686 – 1764 that is required for PLCE1 to be  activated by RHOA, RHOB, GNA12, GNA13 and G-beta gamma. PLCE1 also has a Ca2+ cofactor. Alternative splicing results in multiple transcript variants encoding distinct isoforms.

Function 
PLCE1 belongs to the phospholipase family that catalyzes the hydrolysis of polyphosphoinositides such as phosphatidylinositol-4,5-bisphosphate (PtdIns(4,5)P2) to generate the second messengers Ins(1,4,5)P3 and diacylglycerol. These products initiate a cascade of intracellular responses that result in cell growth and differentiation and gene expression.[supplied by OMIM]

Catalytic activity 

1-phosphatidyl-1D-myo-inositol 4,5-bisphosphate + H2O = 1D-myo-inositol 1,4,5-trisphosphate + diacylglycerol.

Clinical significance 
Mutations in this gene cause early-onset nephrotic syndrome. This disease is characterized by proteinuria, edema, and diffuse mesangial sclerosis or focal and segmental glomerulosclerosis. Signs and symptoms include kidney biopsies demonstrating non-specific histologic changes such as focal segmental glomerulosclerosis and diffuse mesangial proliferation as well as genetic tests revealing a pathogenic S1484L mutation. Diffuse mesangial proliferation is characterized by mesangial matrix expansion with no mesangial hypercellularity, hypertrophy of the podocytes, vacuolized podocytes, thickened basement membranes, and diminished patency of the capillary lumen. This disease has also been associated with mitochondrial cytopathy stemming from respiratory chain deficiency primarily affecting complex IV.

Additionally, Phospholipase C epsilon modulates beta-adrenergic receptor-dependent cardiac contraction and it has been found that this protein is over expressed during heart failure. Research has suggested that PLCE1 may thus inhibit cardiac hypertrophy.

PLCE1 gene polymorphism increases susceptibility to oesophageal, gastric, colon, and squamous cell carcinoma of the head and neck area. It is shown that PLCE1 is highly expressed in osteosarcoma and regulates its proliferation and invasion. PLCE1 also affects the survival of patients with osteosarcoma. Therefore, it is suggested as a potential diagnostic biomarker and molecular therapeutic target for osteosarcoma.

Interactions 

PLCE1 has been shown to have 12 binary protein-protein interactions including 8 co-complex interactions. PLCE1 appears to interact with RyR2, HRAS, NRAS, and LIMS1.

References

Further reading 

 
 
 
 
 
 
 
 
 
 
 
 
 
 
 
 

EC 3.1.4